Chemazé is a commune in the Mayenne department in north-western France.

Notable people
Landry Chauvin, football player and manager, born 1968 in Chemazé

See also
Communes of the Mayenne department

References

Communes of Mayenne